Lamin House is the name for East Kalimantan traditional house. Lamin house is identity of Dayak people who live at East Kalimantan. its 300 meters length, 15 meters width, and 3 meters height. Few family live in Lamin House because this house can accommodate approximately 100 people. In 1967, Indonesia Government inaugurate Lamin House at East Kalimantan. Lamin house have few stanchion to sustain floor house. Lamin house basement used to keep livestock.

References 

Rumah adat